The American Legion Post No. 512 is a war veterans' organization and historic meeting hall located at the corner of Dolores Street and 8th Avenue in Carmel-by-the-Sea, California. The Legion Hall is open to all members of The American Legion. The Alvin B. Chapin Memorial Hall is used for special events and civic functions. The building was registered with the California Register of Historical Resources on January 28, 2002.

History

Manzanita Hall
Residents felt Carmel had special civic needs which could be advanced by a local group. It started in a converted barn on the southwest corner of Mission and Ocean Avenue in 1895, which evolved into the Manzanita Clubhouse. In 1925, the club acquired a lot on Dolores Street and 8th Avenue and hired World War I veteran Guy O. Koepp to design and master builder  M. J. Murphy to build a Spanish Eclectic style house for a new Manzanita Hall. Completed in 1928, it was first known as the Manzanita Clubhouse for men. The first addition was constructed in 1931 with a separate clubroom for cards and billiards. In 1934, the club welcomed a patriotic group of local World War I veterans desirous of forming an American Legion post. The fledgling group of U.S. war veterans held one of its first meetings at the Manzanita Club on October 1, 1934.

As a result, Carmel Post No. 512 of The American Legion received its temporary charter on November 5, 1934, and a permanent charter in 1935. James J. Regan served as its first commander. Post member George F. Whitcomb wrote a poem to the post's chaplain, entitled: A Legionnaire Speaks, which talks about "our sacred right to live as free men do." During World War II the building operated as a USO club. In November 1941 alone, it served more than 1,350 soldiers from Fort Ord. In 1943, the USO Club added another extension to create a U-shaped building and added classes for servicemen and women in arts and crafts.

American Legion Hall

In 1946, the Manzanita Club sold the building to Carmel Post No. 512 of The American Legion. 21st century community support activities have included the post's raising of $10,000 for a new commemorative bell for the Carmel-by-the-Sea World War I Memorial Arch located at the intersection of Ocean Avenue and San Carlos Street. The bell was installed on October 31, 2016, and dedicated on Veterans Day 2016. The Memorial Arch has been a historic landmark since 1921, when it was originally built by World War I veterans. The monument was designed in 1919 by celebrated architect Greene and Greene and is constructed of Carmel stone. Members have been active in Veterans Day ceremonies in Carmel by ringing of the commemorative bell at Ocean and San Carlos followed by an open house at the American Legion Hall.

The American Legion Hall is significant under the California Register of Historical Resources criterion 1, in the area of local history as the meeting place and social hall for the first organized men’s club in Carmel, the historic home of American Legion Post 512, and the location of Carmel's USO during World War II.

See also 
 List of American Legion buildings
 Carmel-by-the-Sea World War I Memorial Arch

References

External links

 
 Carmel-by-the-Sea World War I Memorial Arch
 

1928 establishments in California
American Legion buildings
Buildings and structures completed in 1928
Buildings and structures in California
Carmel-by-the-Sea, California
Clubhouses in California
Eclectic architecture
Spanish Colonial Revival architecture in California
United Service Organizations buildings
United States home front during World War II